Muhammad Ali and Ron Lyle fought a boxing match on May 16, 1975. Ali won the bout through a technical knockout in the 11th round.

This bout was aired live primetime in the United States via ABC with Howard Cosell doing the play-by-play and it took place in Las Vegas, Nevada.

The Fight
Ali entered the bout at 224.5 pounds, the heaviest he had ever been at that point in his career. Lyle, at 219 pounds, was also at the heaviest weight of his career. Lyle had offered the opportunity to compete for the title despite his loss to the then little-known Jimmy Young two months earlier at Honolulu, Hawaii.

Ali had forecast that the bout would be a "treat for the people", but in many of the rounds he preferred to defend and absorb Lyle's sharp punches. The challenger had been exhorted by a chant of "Lyle, Lyle" from several Denver followers, and in the opening round he bloodied Ali's nose, although the bleeding abated.

Ali was jarred sporadically by Lyle's punches, usually the right hand. In the fifth, the champion chose to dance, taunting Lyle with jabs but often being pinned against the ropes. In the sixth, he displayed the "Ali Shuffle", to the delight of the crowd, and to the temporary confusion of the stiff-moving challenger.

As the  ring girl from the Tropicana Hotel in Las Vegas strutted past Ali with a big card signaling the start of the eighth round, Ali stared, aware that this was the round in which he had predicted he would knock Lyle out. From his flatfooted stance, he tried for the knockout, but Lyle cornered and fought him off, particularly with a jarring right hand.

For the next two rounds, Ali rested, boxing defensively and retreating to the ropes while accepting Lyle's punches. But in the fateful 11th when he connected with the right hand. Ali suddenly pounced and finished Lyle (Ali was behind on 2 of the 3 scorecards heading into this round as Judge Bill Kipp had Lyle ahead 49-43 on a 5-point must system, while Art Lurie had Lyle ahead 46-45, and Bill Mangiaracina had it 46-46), making the scorecards of the three judges academic and making Lyle's tv home appearance an unartistic success. The end came with 1:08 of the round, after a straight right hand drove the 33-year old ex-convict across the ring and left him defenseless against the champion's onslaught. Referee Ferd Hernandez stopped the bout. Lyle protested briefly, then staggered to his corner in a daze.

References

Lyle
1975 in boxing
World Boxing Association heavyweight championship matches
World Boxing Council heavyweight championship matches
May 1975 sports events in the United States